Northfork Township is a township in Barton County, Missouri, USA.  As of the 2000 census, its population was 256.

The township takes its name from the North Fork of the Spring River.

Geography
According to the USGS, it contains three cemeteries: Killey, Oak Grove and Waters.

References

 USGS Geographic Names Information System (GNIS)

External links
 US-Counties.com
 City-Data.com

Townships in Barton County, Missouri
Townships in Missouri